is a railway station in Mihara, Hiroshima Prefecture, Japan, operated by West Japan Railway Company (JR West).

Lines
Itozaki Station is served by the Sanyō Main Line.

History
The station opened as the terminus of the Sanyō Railway on July 20, 1892 when the line was extended from Onomichi to this station. The station was named Mihara Station. On June 10, 1894, the railway was further extended to Hiroshima Station thus the present-day Mihara Station opened and the former Mihara Station was renamed Itozaki Station.

See also
 List of railway stations in Japan

External links

References

Railway stations in Japan opened in 1892
Railway stations in Hiroshima Prefecture
Sanyō Main Line